Justicia austrocapensis is a species of perennial herb in the Acanthus family commonly known as the Cape tube-tongue or chuparrosa. It is one of two Justicia species endemic to the Cape region of Baja California Sur, the other being the larger, shrubby, red-flowered Justicia purpusii. It is most similar to other species formerly placed in Siphonoglossa, such as Justicia sessilis of the West Indies and South America.

Description 
The young stems are square-shaped and may be furrowed. The foliage, stems, flowers and fruits are covered in pubescent, non-glandular hairs. The tip of the leaf is acute to acuminate, while the base of the leaf is acute to cordate to truncate.

Flowering and fruiting is from September to December and April to May. The inflorescence is a dichasia emerging from the axils of the leaves (with the distal leaves sometimes being reduced and bract-like), usually bearing a solitary flower. The two-lipped corolla is a rose-pink with a white and darker-pink crow's-foot shaped pattern on the spreading lower lip.

Distribution and habitat 
Justicia austrocapensis is endemic to the Cape region of Baja California Sur, the far southern portion of the peninsula characterized by the Sierra de la Laguna and the San Lucan scrub. It is found in the non-desert portions of the mountains and lowlands of the Cape. It usually occurs on slopes, along watercourses, and in canyons and gulches.

References 

Further reading:
 Type description in

External links 
 Justicia austrocapensis at SEINet
 Justicia austrocapensis at Red de Herbarios del Noroeste de México
 Justicia austrocapensis on EncicloVida

austrocapensis
Flora of Baja California Sur
Natural history of Baja California Sur
Natural history of the Peninsular Ranges
Endemic flora of Mexico
Taxa named by Thomas Franklin Daniel